Calesia dasyptera is a moth of the family Noctuidae first described by Vincenz Kollar in 1844. It is found in Asia, including Taiwan, India and Sri Lanka.

Description
The wingspan of the male is about 50 mm and 40 mm in the female. Forewings with a very large tuft of hair beyond the cell below costa in male, and the costal nervules curved. Forewings with veins 8 to 10 stalked in both sexes. Male has greyish red-brown base color. Head, collar and abdomen crimson. Coxa of forelegs and tibia of forelegs and midlegs are crimson. Female has a white spot at end of cell of forewings.

References

Moths described in 1844
Calpinae